The Solvær islands (Solværøyene) are a group of islands in the municipality of Lurøy in Nordland county, Norway.  They are located between the islands of Lovund to the west and Onøya to the east.  The islands are located about a 90-minute ferry ride west of the mainland.  Due to the Gulf Stream, the climate is mild, with little snow despite its northern location.

The group consists of about 300 small and flat islands, some of which have permanent residents living on them.  Some of the main, inhabited islands include Sleneset, Moflaget, Slotterøya, Straumøya, Nord-Solvær, and Sør-Solvær.  The main village area is Sleneset, which is also the port at which the local ferries stop on the way from Stokkvågen (on the mainland) to the islands of Lovund and Træna to the west. Moflag Church, located on the island Moflaget, is the local church for the islands.

The Solvaer Islands has the highest densities of Eurasian eagle-owls in Europe.

See also
List of islands of Norway

References

Islands of Nordland
Lurøy